Janice Moses is a Trinidadian former cricketer who represented the Trinidad and Tobago women's national cricket team.

A bowler, Moses played in three women's One Day Internationals at the inaugural Women's Cricket World Cup in 1973 in England. Playing in matches against New Zealand, Jamaica and England, she finished the tournament with just one wicket – that of Jamaican opening batsman Elaine Emmanual, out leg before wicket for seven runs.

In 1985, some twelve years after the World Cup, Moses played in two matches against a touring Irish side with both games played at Queen's Park Oval in Port of Spain.

References

 

Living people
Trinidad and Tobago women cricketers
Year of birth missing (living people)
Place of birth missing (living people)